Asarvan (also Romanized as Āsarvān) is a village in Mashhad-e Miqan Rural District, in the Central District of Arak County, Markazi Province, Iran.

Population 
At the 2006 census, Asarvan's population was reported to be below 3 families.

References 

 

Populated places in Arak County
Arak County